The 1977–78 Rugby Union County Championship was the 78th edition of England's County Championship rugby union club competition. 

North Midlands won their first ever title after defeating Gloucestershire in the final.

Second Round

Semi finals

Final

See also
 English rugby union system
 Rugby union in England

References

Rugby Union County Championship
County Championship (rugby union) seasons